Kozluca is a village in the Hozat District, Tunceli Province, Turkey. The village was unpopulated as of 2022.

The hamlets of Akgeçit and Anıklı are attached to the village.

Population 
The village was populated by Kurds of the Qoçan tribe.

The village had no registered population from 2007 to 2013, 2 people in 2014, 1 person in 2015 and unpopulated again between 2016 and 2022.

References 

Kurdish settlements in Tunceli Province
Villages in Hozat District
Unpopulated villages in Turkey